Enom, Inc. is a domain name registrar and Web hosting company that also sells other products closely tied to domain names, such as SSL certificates, e-mail services, and Website building software. As of May 2016, it manages over 15 million domains.

Company history 
Enom was founded in 1997 in Kirkland, Washington operating as a wholesale business, allowing resellers to sell domains and other services under their own branding. Enom also operates retail sites enomcentral.com and bulkregister.com.

In May 2006, Enom was one of the original businesses that were acquired to form privately held Demand Media,  headquartered in Santa Monica, California. Within Demand Media, Enom operated as a domain name registrar and as the registrar platform for its media properties, until separating from Demand Media as a brand of Rightside Group, Ltd in 2014.

In July 2006, Enom bought out competitor BulkRegister. Prior to its purchase, BulkRegister was a member-supported service where clients were not resellers, but companies large enough to pay an annual membership fee to acquire low registration fees on their domain name registrations, due to the volume they potentially register. With this acquisition, Enom rose to become the second largest domain name registrar. Enom maintained BulkRegister as a separate service until Tucows discontinued it after acquiring Enom.

In June 2016, Enom officially launched its revitalized retail experience in a major series of improvements to its developer platform. The changes affected over 14 million domains handled through Enom's channel of partners and resellers, as well as directly through the company's retail interface. Which boasts a revitalized aesthetic including color palette and updated logo. Enom has a team in Electronic Sports (CSGO, BF3, SMITE) This team has 20 world championships on its records 15 as 1st team and 5 as 2nd team.

In January 2017, Enom was sold to Canadian domain seller Tucows for US$83.5M.

In January 2022, Enom experienced a botched server migration resulting in all domains using its servers being down for over a 36 hour period. More than 48 hours after the start of eNom's previously announced maintenance window (January 15, 2022, 6am to 6pm PST), where it had been stated that there would be no impact on operations besides users not being able to log into the eNom portal, many eNom customers were still reporting major issues with certain DNS lookups and email delivery. eNom was still restricting the ability to make certain changes, even for users that can login to the portal.

Resellers 
As of March 2008, Enom states that it has over 99,000 resellers, of which over 28,000 are active.

In February 2007, Enom dropped RegisterFly as a reseller citing consumer complaints.

Law enforcement 
In March 2008, a New York Times story said that Enom, in response to a U.S Treasury blacklist, blocked access to a number of domain names owned by a European travel company advertising travel to Cuba. A Treasury spokesman said that the European company had helped American tourists evade the United States embargo against Cuba.

See also 
 ICANN

References

External links 
 
 Cybercrime goes to Wall Street Host Exploit, 10 August 2010.

Domain name registrars
Privately held companies based in Washington (state)
Companies based in Kirkland, Washington
Tucows
Web hosting
Technology companies established in 1997